Marvin Goldklang is a minority owner of the New York Yankees and the majority owner of the Pittsfield Suns in Massachusetts.  He is also the principal owner of the Charleston RiverDogs, the New York Yankees’ affiliate in the Class A South Atlantic League. Since 2004, he has been in the Hall of Fame of the South Atlantic League. He was inducted in the Florida State League Hall of Fame in 2010, the New York Penn League Hall of Fame in 2018 and was elected to the board of trustees for Minor League Baseball in 2014. He also previously owned the Fort Myers Miracle, the Minnesota Twins' entry in the Class A Florida State League as well as the Hudson Valley Renegades, the Tampa Bay Rays’ affiliate in the short-season New York–Penn League.

Further reading
 This chapter in Ruttman's oral history, based on an April 22, 2009 interview with Goldklang conducted for the book, discusses Goldklang's American, Jewish, baseball, and life experiences from youth to the present.

External links
St. Paul Saints bio
Charleston RiverDogs bio

Baseball executives
New York Yankees owners
New York University alumni
Wharton School of the University of Pennsylvania alumni
University of Pennsylvania Law School alumni
American sports businesspeople
Living people
Year of birth missing (living people)